Cape Verde sent a delegation to compete at the 2008 Summer Paralympics in Beijing, People's Republic of China. Its sole athlete was Artimiza Sequeira who competed in technical disciplines of athletics. Cape Verde did not win a medal at these Games.

Athletics

Women

See also
Cape Verde at the Paralympics
Cape Verde at the 2008 Summer Olympics

References

External links
International Paralympic Committee

Nations at the 2008 Summer Paralympics
2008
Summer Paralympics